Braden Smith (born July 25, 2003) is an American college basketball player for the Purdue Boilermakers of the Big Ten Conference.

Early life and high school career
Smith was born in Arkansas and moved with his family to Westfield, Indiana at age four. He attended Westfield High School and made the varsity basketball team as a freshman. Smith was named first-team All-Hoosier Crossroads Conference (HCC) after he averaged 18.5 points, 5.4 rebounds, 4.7 assists, and 1.5 steals per game during his sophomore season. As a junior, he averaged 22.1 points, 6.2 rebounds, 5.4 assists, and 2.7 steals per game and was named high-honorable mention All-State in addition to repeating as a first team All-HCC selection. Smith was named Indiana Mr. Basketball after averaging 18.3 points, six rebounds, six assists, and 1.9 steals while leading Westfield to their first sectional championship. He also missed several weeks due to a foot injury.

Smith was rated a three-star recruit and committed to playing college basketball for Purdue over offers from Appalachian State, Belmont, Montana, North Texas, and Toledo. At the time of his commitment Purdue was his only major-conference offer, but he had recently begun to receive interest from Indiana, Gonzaga, Xavier, Villanova, and Oregon.

College career
Smith entered his freshman season at Purdue as a starter at guard. In his college debut in the season opener against Milwaukee, he scored seven points with four rebounds, four assists and set a freshman record with seven steals in a 84–57 win. Smith was named the Big Ten Conference Freshman of the Week after scoring 20 points with three assists and two rebounds in a 75–70 win over Marquette.

Personal life
Both of Smith's parents, Ginny and Dustin, played college basketball at Arkansas Tech University. Ginny Smith currently serves as the assistant athletic director and girl's basketball coach at Westfield High School.

References

External links
Purdue Boilermakers bio

2003 births
Living people
American men's basketball players
Basketball players from Indiana
Purdue Boilermakers men's basketball players
Point guards